NFSR may refer to:

 National Fund for Scientific Research, a former government institution in Belgium
 Need for Speed: Rivals, a 2013 racing video game
 Nonlinear feedback shift register, common component in modern stream ciphers